Naughty by Nature is the second album from Naughty by Nature, released on September 3, 1991, through Tommy Boy Records. The album was recorded through November 1990 to August 1991. It was a critical and commercial success, having been certified platinum on February 6, 1992, thanks in large part to the hit single, "O.P.P.," which reached #6 on the Billboard Hot 100 in 1991. 

Additional singles released from the album were "Everything's Gonna Be Alright" and "Uptown Anthem," both of which were minor hits on the Billboard charts.

Reception 

Stanton Swihart of AllMusic claims that "O.P.P." was the most "contagious crossover radio smash in the autumn of 1991." In addition, Swihart considers Naughty by Nature to be "both a pop and a rap classic," as well as a "must-have album for fans of East Coast rap."

Track listing 
 "Yoke the Joker" – 5:13
 "Wickedest Man Alive (feat. Queen Latifah)" – 4:21
 "O.P.P." – 4:31
 "Everything's Gonna Be Alright" – 4:51
 "Let the Ho's Go" – 4:16
 "Every Day All Day" – 5:41
 "Guard Your Grill" – 5:02
 "Pin the Tail on the Donkey" – 3:47
 "1, 2, 3 (feat. Lakim Shabazz and Apache)" – 4:44
 "Strike a Nerve" – 6:22
 "Rhyme'll Shine On (feat. Aphrodity)" – 3:56
 "Thankx for Sleepwalking" – 5:26
 "Uptown Anthem" – 3:04

 "Everything's Gonna Be Alright" is known as "Ghetto Bastard" on certain explicit releases.
 "Uptown Anthem" first appeared on the Juice soundtrack and did not appear on early releases of the album.
 "Pin the Tail on the Donkey" appears on the soundtrack for Tony Hawk's Pro Skater 2

Samples 
"Yoke the Joker"
 "Synthetic Substitution" by Melvin Bliss
"Wickedest Man Alive"
 "Big Beat" by Billy Squier
"O.P.P."
 "ABC" by The Jackson 5
 "Oh Honey" by Delegation
 "Synthetic Substitution" by Melvin Bliss
"Everything's Gonna Be Alright"
 "Hihache" by Lafayette Afro Rock Band
 "I'll Take You There" by Staple Singers
 "No Woman, No Cry" by Bob Marley
"Let the Ho's Go"
 "Bass (How Low Can You Go)" by Simon Harris
 "Pocahontas" by Maynard Ferguson
 "Take Me to the Mardi Gras" by Bob James
"Every Day All Day"
 "Pride and Vanity" by Ohio Players
"Guard Your Grill"
 "Funky Drummer" by James Brown
"Pin the Tail on the Donkey"
 "I Don't Know What This World Is Coming To" by Wattstax
 "Welcome to the Terrordome" by Public Enemy
"1, 2, 3"
 "Candy Man" by Quincy Jones
 "The Last Song" by Above the Law
 "It's Funky Enough" by The D.O.C.
"Rhyme'll Shine On"
 "Devotion (Live)" by Earth, Wind & Fire
 "You'll Like It Too" by Funkadelic
 "For the Love of You" by Isley Brothers
"Thankx for Sleepwalking"
 "You Know My Name (Look Up the Number)" by The Beatles

Charts

Weekly charts

Year-end charts

Singles

Certifications

References 

1991 albums
Naughty by Nature albums
Tommy Boy Records albums